Marie Kettnerová (born in Prague on 4 April 1911; died in London on 28 February 1998) was a female Czech international table tennis player.

Table tennis career
She won an incredible 23 World Table Tennis Championships medals from 1933 to 1950. She was a singles gold medal winner of the World Table Tennis Championships in both women's single and doubles. In singles she won in 1934 and 1935, in doubles in 1936 and three times team gold winner. She was a charter member of the ITTF Hall of Fame.

She also won an English Open title.

See also
 List of table tennis players
 List of World Table Tennis Championships medalists

References 

Czech female table tennis players
Sportspeople from Prague
1911 births
1998 deaths
World Table Tennis Championships medalists
Czechoslovak emigrants to the United Kingdom